The 2018–19 Georgia Tech Yellow Jackets men's basketball team represented the Georgia Institute of Technology during the 2018–19 NCAA Division I men's basketball season. They were led by third-year head coach Josh Pastner and played their home games at Hank McCamish Pavilion as members of the Atlantic Coast Conference.

Previous season
The Yellow Jackets finished the 2017–18 season 13–19, 6–12 in ACC play to finish in 13th place. They lost in the first round of the ACC tournament to Boston College.

Departures

Incoming transfers

2018 recruiting class

Roster

Schedule and results

Source:

|-
!colspan=9 style=| Exhibition

|-
!colspan=9 style=| Non-conference regular season

|-
!colspan=9 style=| ACC Regular Season

|-
!colspan=9 style=| ACC tournament

References

Georgia Tech Yellow Jackets men's basketball seasons
Georgia Tech
2018 in sports in Georgia (U.S. state)